Jean Gilpin (born ) is an English actress.

Early life
Gilpin was born  in London. Her father worked for the United Nations and she thus lived in various locations while growing up, such as China, Cuba, France, Switzerland, Thailand, the Congo, the U.S. (specifically New York City), and Zambia. She attended schools in England, France, Switzerland, and Thailand. She gained a BA in Drama and English from Bristol University before training at the Drama Centre London.

Career
Gilpin first made some brief appearances in BBC Bristol productions as a student in the Bristol University Drama Department. Her first professional theatrical job was a season with the Nottingham Playhouse Company where she received her Equity card. She spent three years at the Glasgow Citizens' Theatre, playing Principal Boy in their traditional pantomimes, and performing in Noël Coward's Semi-Monde directed by Philip Prowse.

Gilpin spent a year with the Royal Shakespeare Company. She played the Duchess of Vanholt in Faustus with Ian McKellen, directed by John Barton. Her first credited appearance on British television was in the role of Julia in The Duchess of Malfi for the BBC. She's also Janet Milton (the found Mum of John) in the episode Reunion, third season of Survivors.

Gilpin is perhaps best known to British television audiences as Sylvia, a precocious Auxiliary Territorial Service member, the niece of Chief Warden Hodges, who attempts unsuccessfully to seduce Private Pike in "The Making of Private Pike" (first broadcast 9 October 1977) in the final series of Dad's Army. Gilpin also won minor roles in several British films of the 1970s including Catch Me a Spy (1971), Feelings (1974), The Stud (1978) and The World Is Full of Married Men (1979). She also featured in several British television commercials, notably as The Avon Lady.

After ten years working in British theatre and television, Gilpin moved to Los Angeles. Her first role there was in Anne Sexton's Transformations at the Coronet Theatre. She also began to take roles in TV and film. She performed in Steven Berkoff's Greek at the Matrix Theatre and the ensemble won the BATCC Award. She co-produced and appeared in the LA premiere of Jean Reynolds' Dance With Me, which was nominated for an LADCC for ensemble.

Since the 1980s, Gilpin has mainly worked as a voice actress on more than 200 projects. She worked regularly on Max Steel. More recently, she has featured as a voice actor in video games, including Neverwinter Nights and James Bond 007: Nightfire. In particular, she has worked regularly for Bethesda Softworks, and can be heard in such games as The Elder Scrolls Online and The Elder Scrolls V: Skyrim as Elenwen, Boethiah, and Meridia. She is also featured in Dragon Age II as the character Meredith, Master of Orion: Conquer the Stars, in King's Quest as Pillare and Merlwyb Bloefhiswyn in the English version of Final Fantasy XIV: A Realm Reborn, credited as Jean Elizabeth0. She also voiced Sangheili character Makhee 'Chava in Halo 5: Guardians and voiced Amanra in Age of Mythology and its sequels.

Gilpin voiced a computer called Stacie in the film Nuclear Hurricane in 2007. She also voiced Mother Helen and various characters in 2011's Dead Island, credited as Elizabeth Gilpin, and voiced The Mother in Dying Light: The Following in 2016. She provided a vocal cameo in the 2021 film Dune as an Ancestral Bene Gesserit.

References

External links
 

1950s births
Living people
Actresses from London
Alumni of the University of Bristol
English television actresses
English voice actresses
Year of birth missing (living people)